Man in a Garage is a single by Coldcut, released in 2006 as the second single from the album Sound Mirrors. It features John Matthias on lead vocals.

In 2013, a remix of this by Nick Franglen of Lemon Jelly was used in an advert for the Ford Fiesta.

References

2006 singles
Coldcut songs